The 1946 San Francisco Dons football team was an American football team that represented the University of San Francisco as an independent during the 1946 college football season. In their first and only season under head coach Maurice J. "Clipper" Smith, the Dons compiled a 3–6 record and were outscored by their opponents by a combined total of 172 to 162.

Forrest Hall led San Francisco's ground attack and ranked 19th nationally with 579 rushing yards and averaged 6.51 yards per carry.

Schedule

After the season

The 1947 NFL Draft was held on December 16, 1946. The following Don was selected.

References

San Francisco
San Francisco Dons football seasons
San Francisco Dons football